Sardaar Ji 2 (previously The Return of Sardaarji) is a 2016 Punjabi comedy film starring Diljit Dosanjh, Monica Gill, and Sonam Bajwa in lead roles and directed by Rohit Jugraj Chauhan The film was released on 24 June 2016. It is a standalone sequel to the 2015 film Sardaar Ji. On release, the film received mixed reviews, unlike the prequel which received positive reviews. The film grossed less than its prequel and was declared average at Box-Office.

Cast
 Diljit Dosanjh as Jaggi / Athraa / Satkaar (triple role)
 Monica Gill as Soni
 Sonam Bajwa as Diljot
 Yashpal Sharma as Teja
 Samreen Kaur as Shiney
 Jaswinder Bhalla as Pathan Chacha
 Dev Gill as Diljyot's fiancée
 Mandy Takhar (special appearance in "Poplin")
 Amritpal Chotu as Fauji's son
 Anjana Sukhani as Dr. Teena (Anger management therapist)

Planning and shooting
After the success of Sardaar Ji, producers decided on a sequel The Return of Sardaarji. The shooting of the film took place in different locations in Australia mainly. Diljit was mobbed by his Australian fans to his surprise when he reached the airport in Australia. The crew also shot at the Macarthur region of New South Wales. During the shoot, Diljit rescued Sonam and others from a horrible accident at the set. Diljit had to undergo 6 months of intensive physical training by hiring Ranbir Kapoor's personal trainer Pradeep Bhatia.

Soundtrack 

The soundtrack of Sardaarji 2 was composed by Jatinder Shah & Nick Dhammu while the lyrics were written by Veet Baljit and Ranbir Singh.

The video of the film's title track Sardaarji was shot for two days in a row, created a record as it features 2500 Sardars dressed in white attires and turbans, out of which 1200 are Diljit's fans who came specially to shoot for the song.

Reception

Box office

The movie broke the record of Sardaar Ji in Punjab, grossing  on the first day.

Accolades

The film received six nominations at 1st Punjabi Filmfare awards, 2017.

Best director- Rohit Jugraj - Nominated

Best music album- Jatinder Shah - Nominated

Best foreign talent- Tiffany Jones- Nominated

Best Lyrics- Ranbir Singh (mitran da junction) -Nominated

Best Lyrics- Veet baljit (poplin) - Nominated

Best playback singer (Male) - Diljit Dosanjh (mitran da junction) - WON

References

External links
 

Films directed by Rohit Jugraj Chauhan
2016 films
Punjabi-language Indian films
2010s Punjabi-language films
Films scored by Jatinder Shah
Films shot in Australia
Indian sequel films